A pheasantry is a place or facility used for captive breeding and rearing pheasants, peafowls and other related birds, which may or may not be confined with enclosures such as aviaries. The pheasants may be sold or displayed to public or used as game birds. Pheasantry may also be used for conservation and research purposes.

Pheasantries
Dhodial Pheasantry, Pakistan
The Princely Pheasantry, Poland (formerly in Germany)

See also
Aviculture
Falconry
Poultry
Hatchery

External links
Allandoo Pheasantry

Zoos
Aviculture
Pheasants